Duke of Almódovar del Río (Ducado de Almodóvar del Río) is a hereditary ducal title in the Spanish nobility which holds a Grandeeship of Spain 2nd Class. It was conferred on 11 July 1780 on Pedro Jiménez de Góngora, 6th Marquess of Almodóvar del Río, by King Charles III of Spain, thus raising to a dukedom the Marquessate of Almodóvar del Río. This title had been granted to Francisco Jiménez de Góngora y Castillejo by King Charles II of Spain, the 13 May 1667. Historically, the title corresponds to dominion over the area around Almodóvar del Río.

Marquesses of Almodóvar del Río (1667-1780)
Francisco Jiménez de Góngora, 1st Marquess of Almodóvar del Río
Luis José Jiménez de Góngora, 2nd Marquess of Almodóvar del Río, only son of the 1st Marques
Antonio Suárez de Góngora, 3rd Marquess of Almodóvar del Río, distant cousin of the 2nd Marquess. Head of the House of Góngora
Pedro Suárez de Góngora, 4th Marquess of Almodóvar del Río, elder son of the 3rd Marquess
Ana Suárez de Góngora, 5th Marchioness of Almodóvar del Río, eldest daughter of the 4th Marquess
Pedro Suárez de Góngora, 6th Marquess of Almodóvar del Río, eldest son of the 3rd Marquess. Became Duke

Dukes of Almodóvar del Río (1780)
Pedro Suárez de Góngora, 1st Duke of Almodóvar del Río
María Rafaela Suárez de Góngora, 2nd Duchess of Almodóvar del Río, elder sister of the 1st Duke
Josefa de Carroz, 3rd Duchess of Almodóvar del Río, only daughter of the 2nd Duchess
Francisco de Paula Fernández de Córdoba, 4th Duke of Almodóvar del Río, descendant of the 1st Marquess' only sister
Joaquín Fernández de Córdoba, 5th Duke of Almodóvar del Río, eldest brother of the 4th Duke
Joaquín Fernández de Córdoba, 6th Duke of Almodóvar del Río, eldest son of the 5th Duke
Isabel Fernández de Córdoba, 7th Duchess of Almodóvar del Río, elder surviving daughter of the 6th Duke
Genoveva de Hoces, 8th Duchess of Almodóvar del Río, only daughter of the 6th Duke's only sister. Married to Juan Manuel Sánchez y Gutiérrez de Castro
José Ramón Sánchez, 9th Duke of Almodóvar del Río, eldest son of the 8th Duchess
José Manuel Sánchez, 10th Duke of Almodóvar del Río, only son of the 9th Duke
Alfonso de Hoyos, 11th Duke of Almodóvar del Río, elder son of the 8th Duke's only sister
Isidoro de Hoyos, 12th Duke of Almodóvar del Río, elder son of the 11th Duke

See also
List of dukes in the peerage of Spain
List of current Grandees of Spain

References

Gradesp.org.uk Dukedom of Almodóvar del Río
Geneall.net List of Dukes of Almodóvar del Río
Elenco de Grandezas y Títulos Nobiliarios Españoles, Hidalguía Editions, 2008

Dukedoms of Spain